Gastrodia queenslandica, commonly known as rainforest bells, is a leafless terrestrial mycotrophic orchid in the family Orchidaceae. It has one or two small, yellowish brown, tube-shaped flowers on a thin, brittle flowering stem and grows in rainforest in tropical north Queensland, Australia.

Description 
Gastrodia queenslandica is a leafless terrestrial, mycotrophic herb that has a thin, fleshy, brittle, light brown flowering stem bearing one or two yellowish brown, tube-shaped flowers that are orange-coloured inside. The tube is rough on the outside and orange-coloured and smooth inside. Flowering occurs from November to January.

Taxonomy and naming
Gastrodia queenslandica was first formally described in 1964 by Alick William Dockrill who published the description in The North Queensland Naturalist.  In 2004, David Jones and Mark Clements changed the name to Demorchis queenslandica but the change has not been accepted by the World Checklist of Selected Plant Families.

Distribution and habitat
Rainforest bells grows in near coastal rainforest between the Russell River and the McIlwraith Range but is rarely seen.

Conservation
This orchid is classed as "near threatened" under the Queensland Government Nature Conservation Act 1992.

References 

queenslandica
Plants described in 1964
Terrestrial orchids
Orchids of Queensland